Uttambhai Nathalal Mehta (1924 - 1998) was an Indian businessman and the founder and chairman of Torrent Group.

Early and personal life 
Mehta was born in Mehmadpur, a small village in Palanpur district, India. After finishing his primary education in Palanpur, moved to Mumbai, where he completed his B.Sc. from Wilson College, while staying at the Mahavir Jain Vidyalay hostel.

Mehta and his wife Shardaben, had four children, sons Sudhir and Samir, and daughters Meena and Nayna.

Career 
He started his career as a government servant in 1944. He worked as a medical representative for the pharmaceutical company Sandoz from 1945 to 1958.

Then in 1959 he took the path breaking decision to start his own firm Trinity Laboratories with a seed capital of just Rs 25,000. This organization began to manufacture special medicines. In 1968, Mr. Mehta began to market a medicine for treatment of mental diseases at a very reasonable price.

It was a big step at a time when only multinational companies manufactured specialty drugs, and subsequently Mr. Mehta went on to establish Torrent Laboratories in 1976. The company began marketing a number of useful drugs at very competitive prices and soon made a name for itself. Today, Torrent is a large company engaged in the business of pharmaceutical goods and power generation.

Mr. Mehta also contributed generously to social, educational and charitable institutions and causes.

Awards and recognition 
He was conferred with numerous felicitations, including the ‘Business Man of the Year’ award in 1996-97 from the Government of India. Torrent has also won many awards for excellence in manufacturing, exporting and marketing.

U. N. Mehta Institute of Cardiology and Research Centre (UNMICRC) at Ahmedabad, Gujarat is named after him. Over the years, Torrent group has provided sizeable financial contribution, which has been used for constructing a 450-bedded facility. Apart from Hospital Infrastructure development, Torrent’s Patient Care Initiative Programme at UNMICRC has resulted in effective service delivery and better hospital management. The treatment is rendered to all patients, particularly the economically disadvantaged. Free Cardiac treatment is provided to Gujarat domiciled children and patients from the weaker strata.

References

1924 births
1998 deaths
20th-century Indian businesspeople
Indian company founders
Indian chairpersons of corporations
People from Banaskantha district
Torrent Group
Indian Jains
20th-century Indian Jains